Marlene Kratz  is a fictional character from the Australian soap opera Neighbours, played by Moya O'Sullivan. She made her first screen appearance during the episode broadcast on 5 July 1994 and remained in the show until 14 October 1997, when the character went on a three-month cruise and never returned. Marlene was an elderly lady who owned a bric-a-brac store and was obsessed with Elvis Presley. In 2005, O'Sullivan reprised her role of Marlene for Neighbours' 20th anniversary. The character revealed she is still sailing the seas.

Casting
In August 1997, Jason Herbison of Inside Soap reported O'Sullivan was to leave Neighbours. A show spokesperson said "It's a real shame because Moya is one of the most popular members of the cast. The powers that be obviously feel her role has come to an end." Herbison thought O'Sullivan's departure had something to do with the return of Madge (Anne Charleston) and Harold Bishop (Ian Smith), who previously lived in Marlene's house. He later reported that O'Sullivan was sad to be written out of the show, but had settled back in Sydney. In April 2005, Kris Green of Digital Spy confirmed O'Sullivan would be reprising her role of Marlene to join the many ex-cast members returning for the Neighbours 20th anniversary special episode.

Development
Shortly before she arrived on screen, Marlene purchased Number 24. She sent her grandson, Sam (Richard Grieve), along to inspect the house hoping he would also meet his cousins who were living in Ramsay Street. Marlene eventually arrived in Erinsborugh and sought a reconciliation with her daughter, Cheryl (Caroline Gillmer), who she had left when she was eleven. Josephine Monroe, author of Neighbours: the first 10 years, said Cheryl had "demonized her mother in her mind" and wanted nothing to do with her. However, as she got to know Marlene a little better, Cheryl admitted she quite liked her although she could bring herself to call her "mum". Marlene sold cosmetics, before opening a bric-a-brac store. She liked to invent a background story for all the items that passed through the "wacky" shop. Monroe described Marlene as a bit scatty and always on for a scam or a bet.
  
In 1996, Marlene embarked on a whirlwind romance with Colin Taylor (Frank Bren). Shortly after Colin returns to Erinsborough, he sets out to win Marlene's heart. When asked what "lively" Marlene could possibly have in common with Colin, O'Sullivan told Inside Soap "They just hit it off in a big way. There's no big passion but they do have similar interests. Although she's surrounded by a loving family, it's nice for her to have someone of her own vintage around to care for her." The pair grow closer and O'Sullivan said they have a happy bond and it is definitely love between them. Dave Lanning of The People commented on the storyline, saying the Neighbours plotliners must have been on magic mushrooms when they decided to pair Marlene with the "terminally boring" Colin.

Storylines
Marlene arrives in Ramsay Street after purchasing Number 24 from Madge Bishop and she is joined by her grandson, Sam. It soon becomes apparent Marlene had purchased the house to be nearer to her estranged daughter, Cheryl, who she had walked out on in her childhood. Cheryl refuses to have anything to do with Marlene at first, but she softens after Marlene knits booties for the baby Cheryl is expecting.

Marlene settles into the area and befriends fellow pensioner Helen Daniels (Anne Haddy) and later runs her own bric-a-brac shop and plays surrogate mother to teenage runaway Bianca Zanotti (Anna Gagliardi). After Bianca's departure Marlene later takes in lodgers Annalise Hartman (Kimberley Davies) and Cody Willis (Peta Brady). After Cheryl's relationship with Lou Carpenter (Tom Oliver) breaks down, Cheryl, her daughter Louise (Jiordan Anna Tolli) and son Darren (Todd MacDonald) move into Number 24 with her. Cheryl is later killed in a car accident, leaving the family devastated and Marlene is left to keep the peace between Lou and Darren. When Madge returns to Erinsborough to reconcile with her husband, Harold, Marlene moves in next door with Lou and rents the house to the Bishops.

Marlene takes a job working for Karl Kennedy (Alan Fletcher) and finds herself competing with Sarah Beaumont (Nicola Charles) for the title of Receptionist of the Year. She later leaves for a three-month cruise, but is not seen for eight years until she appears in Annalise's documentary about Ramsay Street, where she reveals she is still sailing the seas.

Reception
A writer for the BBC's Neighbours website stated that Marlene's most notable moment was "Reuniting with Cheryl after so long." To celebrate the 20th anniversary of the soap, the BBC Online readers were asked to nominate their twenty favourite obscure characters. Marlene came in tenth place and the readers commented "Marlene Kratz, the mother of Lou Carpenter's late wife Cheryl Stark. Reason? For heading off on a three-month cruise in the mid-1990s, never to be seen or spoken of again." A columnist for Inside Soap branded Marlene "the grooviest granny in Erinsborough, who throws herself into any worthy cause, and opens her house to every passing waif and stray." John Millar from the Daily Record called the character an "ageing cabbage patch doll".

To celebrate Neighbours' 25th anniversary, British satellite broadcasting company Sky, included Marlene in their list of twenty-five characters who were the most memorable in the serial's history. A writer for Sky said "Considering Marlene was originally introduced in the rather serious business of being estranged for several decades from daughter Cheryl, she made a name for herself with comic storylines, largely revolving around getting into trouble with grandchildren Sam, Brett and Dannii. With her nineties shirts and love of Elvis Presley, Marlene spent three years getting into old lady scrapes before leaving on a three-month cruise. That was in 1997, so she's due back any day now."

Alex Fletcher from Digital Spy made Marlene their "DS Icon" on 7 January 2011, calling her a legendary and special character. Of Marlene and her personality, Fletcher commented "Spending only three years on Ramsay Street, Marlene made an emotional impact on viewers who loved her wheeler dealer lifestyle (selling VCRs, running a bric-a-brac shop), constant scrapes and bantering with daughter Cheryl and son-in-law Lou Carpenter. Marlene, played by the delightful Moya O'Sullivan, was a crucial cog in the Golden Age of Neighbours in the '90s." Fletcher believed that the character's unusual exit and how she did not return from her cruise only added to the mystery surrounding her. The reporter added "The only glimpse we got of Marlene was a short clip in the 2005 anniversary show, where she was shown still sailing the seas. While that finally put to rest the rumours that Lou and Harold had bumped her off, her seemingly never-ending cruise still seems highly curious. Many suspect that she may have shacked up with a cheeky cabin boy, but we can't confirm that detail."

References

External links
 Marlene Kratz at the BBC

Neighbours characters
Television characters introduced in 1994
Fictional receptionists
Female characters in television